Radiodiffusion Nationale Tchadienne (RNT); (English: Chadian National Radio) is the state-operated national radio broadcaster of Chad. RNT was able to reach the entire country through transmitters located at N'Djamena, Sarh, Moundou, and Abéché as of 1988.

From N’Djamena RNT is broadcasting in seven african leanguages as well as in french and arab. 

RNT is operating the state TV-station Tele Tchad (ONRTV).

See also
 Media of Chad

References

Radio stations in Chad
Publicly funded broadcasters